József Szabados (born 2 December 1971) is a retired Hungarian football defender.

References

1971 births
Living people
Hungarian footballers
Budapest Honvéd FC players
Pécsi MFC players
FC Sopron players
Association football defenders
Hungary youth international footballers